Franklin is the southwesternmost independent city in Hampton Roads, Commonwealth of Virginia. As of the 2020 census, the population was 8,180. The Bureau of Economic Analysis combines the city of Franklin with Southampton County for statistical purposes.

History
The city of Franklin had its beginnings in the 1830s as a railroad stop along the Blackwater River. During this era, the river was used to transport goods to and from Albemarle Sound in North Carolina.

Civil War

In 1862, the Civil War came to Franklin, in what was referred to as the Joint Expedition against Franklin. As several U.S. Navy flag steamships, led by the USS Commodore Perry, tried to pass through Franklin on the Blackwater River, a band of local Confederates opened fire on the ships. As stated by an officer aboard one of the ships, "The fighting was the same— Here and there high banks with dense foliage, a narrow and very crooked stream, with the frequent heavy firing of musketry."In all, the battle yielded five naval casualties killed in action and 16 wounded. As the naval vessels retreated, the Confederates tried to block the narrow Blackwater River by felling large trees across it. In the end, the Confederate attempts failed, as no soldiers were captured and no ships were lost. A total of seven Medals of Honor were awarded to individual seamen for their distinguished service.

Industrialization and the Camp family

It was not until 1887 that Franklin began to see significant growth.  Six brothers from the Camp family, with local roots, took possession of a local sawmill. The sawmill was small and had been operating for several years alongside the Blackwater River With the Camp family's acquisition of the mill, it experienced 20 years of rapid growth under the leadership of Paul Douglas Camp (president), James Leonidas Camp (vice-president) and Robert Judson Camp (secretary-treasurer).  Franklin became a stop on the Atlantic and Danville Railway in 1890. At the end of this period, after a bout with near-bankruptcy, World War I brought the Camp family back to financial success, bringing along with it the city of Franklin. By 1918, "Tiny Franklin had become a booming wartime village..."

By 1955, the Camp Corporation's annual sales reached $28 million, much of which spread throughout the city of Franklin. The Camp family, with a strong sense of family and community, gave much back to the city of Franklin through above-average wages and generous donations to local causes. On May 29, 1956, the residents of Franklin were informed that the Local Camp Manufacturing Corporation had just negotiated a merger with the Union Bag and Paper company operating out of New York. This merger formed the Union Camp Corporation.

The city continued to grow along with Union Camp and was incorporated as an independent city in 1961, separating from Southampton County.

Union Camp thrived in Franklin until 1999 when it was acquired by International Paper. Though Union Camp no longer exists in Franklin, the Camp family name lives on. Their legacy is most notable in the community, with Paul D. Camp Community College, the James L Camp Jr. YMCA, the Texie Camp Marks Children's Center, and the Ruth Camp Campbell Memorial Library.

Geography 

Franklin is located in southeastern Virginia at  (36.674954, -76.930799). Its eastern border is the Blackwater River, a south-flowing tributary of the Chowan River, the principal inflow for Albemarle Sound in North Carolina. To the west US 58 leads  to Emporia. U.S. Route 258 passes through the center of Franklin as East Second Avenue, South Main Street, and South Street; US 258 leads northeast  to Windsor, Virginia, and southwest  to Murfreesboro, North Carolina.

Isle of Wight County is to the north and east, and Southampton County, is to the north, west, and south.

Climate 
The climate in this area is characterized by hot, humid summers and generally mild to cool winters.  According to the Köppen Climate Classification system, Franklin has a humid subtropical climate, abbreviated "Cfa" on climate maps.

The Blackwater River, running along the eastern boundary of the city, played an important role in the industrialization of the city but has not been immune to problems plaguing rivers, most notably flooding. The resultant flooding caused the submersion of 182 business and 150 homes, located primarily in downtown. When the hurricane name "Floyd" was retired in 2000, the name chosen as a replacement was Franklin. In 2006, Franklin endured another large-scale flood reaching just below the record  water line set from the 1999 flood. The flood was the result of a storm that distributed a large amount of water throughout the watershed in which Franklin resides.

Demographics

2020 census

Note: the US Census treats Hispanic/Latino as an ethnic category. This table excludes Latinos from the racial categories and assigns them to a separate category. Hispanics/Latinos can be of any race.

2010 Census

As of the census of 2010, there were 8,582 people, 3,384 households, and 2,277 families residing in the city.  The population density was 999.2 people per square mile (385.9/km2).  There were 3,767 housing units at an average density of 451.0 per square mile (174.2/km2).  The racial makeup of the city was 56.9% Black or African American, 39.4% White, 0.7% Asian, 0.0% Pacific Islander, 0.7% from other races, 0.3% Native American, and 1.9% from two or more races.  1.6% of the population were Hispanic or Latino of any race.

There were 3,384 households, out of which 30.1% had children under the age of 18 living with them, 41.8% were married couples living together, 21.9% had a female householder with no husband present, and 32.7% were non-families. 28.9% of all households were made up of individuals, and 12.8% had someone living alone who was 65 years of age or older.  The average household size was 2.39 and the average family size was 2.93.

In the city, the population was spread out, with 25.1% under the age of 18, 7.7% from 18 to 24, 24.9% from 25 to 44, 23.9% from 45 to 64, and 18.4% who were 65 years of age or older.  The median age was 40 years. For every 100 females, there were 79.2 males.  For every 100 females aged 18 and over, there were 73.4 males.

The median income for a household in the city was $31,687, and the median income for a family was $40,299. Males had a median income of $32,083 versus $21,927 for females. The per capita income for the city was $18,573.  About 16.8% of families and 19.8% of the population were below the poverty line, including 34.9% of those under age 18 and 10.2% of those aged 65 or over.

Economy 
Modern Franklin has two major industrial sectors: agriculture and manufacturing. Franklin is listed as being the 13th-most profitable and 12th-largest farming community in the state. The neighboring areas of Southampton and Isle of Wight counties, along with the city of Suffolk, are all ranked in the 20 most profitable farming counties, with Southampton County being the eighth-largest in the state.

With the high agricultural profile of Franklin and the surrounding areas, it was only with the opening of the Camp Lumber Mill in 1887 that the manufacturing sector began to expand. The Camp Lumber Mill became the Union Camp Corporation, which was eventually bought by International Paper. Today, the International Paper mill, located on the eastern boundary of the city, beside the Blackwater River, produces lumber, pulp and paper products and other chemical by-products.

International Paper announced on October 22, 2009, that the paper mill would be permanently closed, which took place in May 2010. This eliminated ~1,100 jobs from the community. They have since resumed limited manufacturing, producing fluff pulp. This resulted in 213 new jobs.

Arts and culture

Arts facilities and museums 
Franklin has a mini-museum of firefighting at the Franklin Fire Department.  The Blackwater Regional Library system has the Ruth Camp Campbell Memorial Library.

Events and festivals 
Annual events in Franklin include the Lumberjack Festival and the Juneteenth Cultural Celebration. In the fall, the city hosts the Franklin Fall Festival and the Downtown Boo Bash. There is also the annual Franklin Christmas Parade and the Holiday Open House & Craft Fair.

Architecture 

Originally the city's train depot, the restored Franklin Depot & Visitors Center is located in Historic Downtown Franklin. The Elms (Franklin, Virginia) is a Queen Anne and Colonial Revival style house built in 1898; it is listed on the National Register of Historic Places. The seventeen-acre Woods Hills estate is also National Register-listed. The Franklin Historic District includes 226 contributing residential and commercial buildings including the circa 1840 Camp Family Homestead, Pretlow Peanut Company Warehouses, and numerous churches.

Sports 
Franklin High School is home to the 2004 and 2008 VHSL Division 1A State Football Champions. Franklin City Schools is home to FIRST Robotics Competition Team 1610 who were winners of the FIRST Robotics NASA/VCU regional robotics competition in 2006 and the FIRST Robotics Virginia regional competition in 2013, 2014, and 2015.

Parks and recreation 
The Franklin Department of Parks & Recreation oversees eleven sites, including Barrett's Landing on the Blackwater River, the Blackwater River Boat Landing, and the Nottoway River Boat Landing which include boat ramps for fishing and boating. James L. Camp Jr. YMCA is located in Franklin.

Government 

Both major parties of the United States political system operate in Franklin with official committees.

The Democratic Party of Virginia is represented by City Councilman (Ward 5) Gregory McLemore (D) who became Chairman of the Franklin Democratic Committee in 2020.

Since at least 2012, the Republican Party of Virginia did not have official representation for the City of Franklin due to the lack of appointment of a representative for Franklin, which combined with Southampton County forms the Franklin-Southampton Republican Party ("FSGOP"), one of three multi-jurisdictional "Combined Units" throughout the Commonwealth of Virginia in Republican Party of Virginia politics.

In 2020, the City of Franklin's political representation to the 3rd Congressional District of Virginia GOP Committee was re-established with the election of Timothy C. Bradshaw, a local entrepreneur and political outsider, as Chairman of the Franklin City / Southampton County Republican Committee, while an elected member of the Southampton County Board of Supervisors, Christopher Cornwell, was appointed to represent Southampton County to the 4th Congressional District GOP Committee.

Education 
Franklin City Public Schools includes S. P. Morton Elementary School which includes pre-K through 5, J. P. King, Jr. Middle School which includes grades 6 through 8, and Franklin High School which includes grades 9 through 12. Paul D. Camp Community College is also located in Franklin.

Infrastructure

Transportation

Air transit 
The Franklin Municipal Airport (John Beverly Rose Field) is located in Franklin.

Primary Routes

Healthcare 
The Bon Secours - Southampton Medical Center is a 221-bed hospital located in Franklin.

Utilities 
Franklin Municipal Power and Light provide electricity for the city.

Notable people 
Randy Blythe (1971- ), musician Lamb of God (band)
Terry Bradshaw, professional baseball coach 
James Leonidas Camp, founder and vice-president of Camp Manufacturing Company, later Union Camp
Paul Douglas Camp, founder and president of Camp Manufacturing Company, later Union Camp
Robert Judson Camp, founder and secretary/treasurer of Camp Manufacturing Company, later Union Camp
Paul Councill, politician
Colgate Darden (1897-1981), politician, University of Virginia president, namesake of Darden School of Business
Georgia Mabel DeBaptiste, journalist, teacher, and social worker
Wyatt Durrette, attorney and politician
John James Dyer, United States district judge of the United States District Court for the District of Iowa
Garland Gray, politician
Lansing Hatfield, bass-baritone opera singer and radio personality
Della Irving Hayden (1851-1924), founder of the Franklin Normal and Industrial Institute
Joseph Holland, stage and screen actor
Mul Holland, professional baseball player
Richard Hudson, congressman
William B. Lindsey, politician
Pauline C. Morton, educator and activist
Charlie Peete (1929-1956), baseball player
William V. Rawlings, attorney and politician
Fleming Rutledge (1937-), preacher, author, and Episcopalian priest
B. Scott, television personality, radio show host, and internet celebrity
Greg Scott (1979- ), professional football player, philanthropist
Randolph Scott, film actor
Charlie Whitehead, soul singer

See also 
National Register of Historic Places listings in Franklin, Virginia

References

External links

City of Franklin official website
Downtown Franklin official website
Franklin-Southampton Economic Development, Inc. official website
Escape to Tradition - Official Tourism website
Hampton Roads Economic Development Alliance, serving Franklin

 
Cities in Virginia
Black Belt (U.S. region)
Majority-minority counties and independent cities in Virginia